The 2016 iHeartRadio Music Awards was the third music award show presented by iHeartMedia's platform iHeartRadio and was televised live on TBS, TNT and truTV. The awards was held on April 3, 2016, at The Forum in Inglewood, California, and was hosted by American singer Jason Derulo.

Taylor Swift and The Weeknd led the nominations with seven categories, followed by Adele with five nominations.

Performers

Presenters
Justin Timberlake — presented Best Tour to Taylor Swift
Pharrell Williams — presented the Innovator Award to U2
Diplo — introduced Chris Brown
Meagan Good — introduced Meghan Trainor
Pete Wentz — presented Biggest Triple Threat
2 Chainz — presented R&B Artist of the Year
Julianne Hough— presented Dance Artist of the Year
Trey Songz — presented Song of the Year
Kelly Osbourne — introduced Demi Lovato
Zendaya — introduced Zayn
Selena Gomez — presented Album of the Year
Wiz Khalifa
Big Sean
Derek Hough
Kat Graham
Demi Lovato — introduced Iggy Azalea

Source:

Winners and nominees
The nominees were announced on February 9, 2016. Winners are listed first and highlighted in boldface.

Changes
Taylor Swift and The Weeknd were nominated for the inaugural Female and Male Artist of the Year categories (the previous two years featured simply Artist of the Year). Swift was the big winner of the night with four awards, including Best Tour and Album of the Year.

Out of the 29 categories, the awards also feature 7 fan-voted categories including Best Fan Army, Best Lyrics and Best Collaboration, as well as four new categories: Best Cover Song, Best Song from a Movie, Biggest Triple Threat and Most Meme-Able Moment. Voting took place via the iHeartRadio website from February 9 through March 25, except for Fan Army and Meme-Able Moment, which continued through the evening of the awards on April 3.

References

2016
2016 in American music
2016 in California
2016 music awards
2016 awards in the United States
April 2016 events in the United States